Ahmed Abdulla Ali Abdulla (born 1 April 1987) is a Bahraini footballer who plays as a defender for Al-Najma and the Bahrain national team.

Career
Abdulla Ali was included in Bahrain's squad for the 2019 AFC Asian Cup in the United Arab Emirates.

Career statistics

International

References

External links
 
 
 
 
 Ahmed Abdulla Ali at WorldFootball.com

1987 births
Living people
Bahraini footballers
Bahrain international footballers
Association football defenders
East Riffa Club players
Busaiteen Club players
Bahraini Premier League players
2019 AFC Asian Cup players
Footballers at the 2006 Asian Games
Asian Games competitors for Bahrain